Albert Austin "Austy" Tate (February 14, 1894 – August 7, 1943) was an American football player and coach.  He served as the head football coach at Lehigh University from 1928 to 1933 and at Bloomsburg University of Pennsylvania from 1936 to 1939, compiling a career college football record of 23–58–4.  Tate was an alumnus of Lehigh, Class of 1917.

Coaching career
Tate served as the 17th head football coach  at Lehigh University in Bethlehem, Pennsylvania and he held that position for six seasons, from 1928 until 1933.  His record at Lehigh was 18–33–3 ties.  He had been the head coach at nearby Bethlehem High School for six seasons, from 1921 to 1926.

Death
Tate died unexpectedly on August 7, 1943, in Bethlehem, Pennsylvania, at the age of 49.

Head coaching record

College

References

External links
 

1894 births
1943 deaths
American football tackles
Bloomsburg Huskies football coaches
Lehigh Mountain Hawks football coaches
Lehigh Mountain Hawks football players
Lehigh Mountain Hawks men's lacrosse players
High school football coaches in Pennsylvania
Sportspeople from Boston
Players of American football from Boston